Putnam Bridge may refer to:

Bridges:
 William H. Putnam Memorial Bridge, a highway bridge in Connecticut, United States
 Putnam Street Bridge, a historical crossing in Marietta, Ohio, United States
 A bridge of the New York and Putnam Railroad formerly crossing the Harlem River in New York City, United States

Other:
 Putnam's Bridge, a song by Dave Eggar